Kirkland Laing (20 June 1954 – 9 June 2021) was a Jamaican-born, British welterweight boxer nicknamed The Gifted One.

Laing fought 56 times in a twenty-year career, the highlight of which was a shock split decision win over Roberto Durán in September 1982. The fight was selected as Ring Magazine's upset of the year. He was a two-time winner of the British welterweight title and won the EBU welterweight title in 1990, with a second round knockout of Antoine Fernandez at the Wembley Conference Centre.

Early life
Laing was born in Jamaica in 1954. Shortly before his birth, his mother Louise fell off a bicycle. As a result Laing had some developmental difficulties resulting in difficulty walking before the age of five. He also attributes his unconventional boxing stance to this early trauma. He grew up in Nottingham, UK.

Career
Kirkland showed early promise. In May 1972, he beat Vernon Sallas, claiming the 1972 Amateur Boxing Association British featherweight title, when boxing out of the Clifton ABC. His dream was to box in the Olympics like his hero Muhammad Ali, though was not selected to compete in the Munich Games that year. Within the next four years he had turned professional and trained at the renowned Lawless's gym.

The Gifted One
Laing was nicknamed "The Gifted One". His stance was famously "hands down" and wide legged, which left him open to strikes from his opponents, though also gave him the perfect balance to bob and weave out of harm's way. In this way he won against the favourite Duran in 1982, which should have been a pivotal point in his career. However, he struggled to cope with the pressure of success and instead turned to cannabis. 

Laing's boxing career was sporadic, as he often failed to deliver on his promise, appearing under-prepared against less able fighters and indulging in drink, drugs and gambling. In the year following his victory over Durán, Laing went missing, blowing his earnings. In that same period Durán was to fight four times, earning an estimated $6m. 

He lost a fight for the European Welterweight title in 1989, but won it a year later by defeating Antoine Fernandez with a knock out in the second round. This was his highest achievement. 

Laing continued to fight until he was 40, and retired after a stoppage loss to future world champion Glenn Catley. After retiring, Laing continued to live in Hackney, and fell from his balcony in 2003 in circumstances that remain unexplained. Shortly after a BBC documentary by Steve Bunce (made before the fall) was aired. The short film showed Laing to be living life on the streets, although others who know him questioned the piece's accuracy.

In 2009, Oliver Jarrat released the book "The Gifted One" Kirkland Laing Through the Eyes of Others, a detailed account of Laing's life and career which took the author six years to research and complete. The book contains many insights from people who were close to the fighter including former managers, trainers and opponents he faced at both amateur and professional level.

In 2015, a portrait of Laing by photographer Chris Moyse was acquired by the National Portrait Gallery, London.

Laing lived in a care home in Blidworth, near Nottingham, before his death on 9 June 2021.

References

External links
 
 

|-

|-

1954 births
2021 deaths
English male boxers
English people of Jamaican descent
Welterweight boxers
British male boxers
Jamaican emigrants to the United Kingdom